Oh Keo-don (born 28 October 1948) is a South Korean public servant and politician who served as mayor of Busan from 2018 until 2020.

Life
Oh Keo-don was born in Busan in 1948.

After passing the Public Administration and Public Administration Examination in 1973, Oh served as Minister of Oceans and Fisheries from 2005 to 2006. On June 13, 2018, he was elected mayor of Busan, beating Suh Byung-soo of the Liberty Korea Party in the election.

Controversy & resignation 
Oh Keo-don sexually harassed a female aide during a meeting on April 7, 2020. However, it is a separate case from the Me Too allegation claimed by Gaseyeon. And when the victim demanded Oh Keo-don's resignation as mayor, he pledged to resign by the end of April and was notarized

On April 23, 2020, he resigned from the mayor of Busan Metropolitan City, revealing that he sexually harassed a female aide during a recent meeting. In this case, Byeon Sung-wan, the administrative mayor of Busan Metropolitan City, will take over as acting mayor of Busan Metropolitan City.

Immediately after Oh Keo-don announced his intention to resign, the victim expressed regret through the Korea Sexual Violence Counseling Center and did not report it to the police, even though he said the situation at the time was clearly a punishable crime. In the statement, the victim said, "I was summoned by Oh's secretary for the first time during work hours early this month, and I hurriedly went to the office to be sexually harassed by the words of business calls," adding, "I realized that I could be recognized as a forced molestation, regardless of the seriousness, I am afraid that I would be seen as an unusual person," adding, "There was no political pressure and no conciliation."

The next day, the leaders of the Democratic Party of Korea held an ethics committee meeting to decide to expel Oh Keo-don, but failed to open due to a lack of quorum, and unanimously decided to expel him on April 27, 2020.

On June 29, 2021 Oh was sentenced to three years in prison by the Busan District Court for sexually assaulting and injuring two female employees while he was the mayor of Busan. The court rejected his claims that his crimes could be excused due to his alleged dementia and cognitive problems.

References

External links
 Official Website

1948 births
Living people
Minjoo Party of Korea politicians
People from Busan
Mayors of Busan
Haeju Oh clan
South Korean rapists
Dong-a University alumni